Division 2 Södra (literally, "Division 2 Southern") was a league of the second level, Division 2, in the league system of Swedish football. It comprised between ten and fourteen Swedish football teams and had status as an official second-level league from 1928–29 to 1946–47 and from 1972 to 1986.

History 
The league was formed as one of two official second-level leagues in 1928–29, and from 1932–33 as one of four. It was replaced by Division 2 Sydvästra in 1947–48, but was recreated again in 1972. In 1987, the new Division 1 leagues were formed and replaced Division 2 as the second level, this also marked the end for Division 2 Södra.

Previous winners

League champions 

Defunct football competitions in Sweden